Empire Football Club is an Antiguan association football club based in the Gray's Farm neighborhood of St. John's, Antigua and Barbuda. The club is the most successful Antiguan football club winning the Antigua and Barbuda Premier Division on thirteen occasions.

Honors 
 Antigua and Barbuda Premier Division: 13
1969, 1970, 1971, 1972, 1973, 1974–75, 1978–79, 1987–88, 1991–92, 1997–98, 1998–99, 1999–2000, 2000–01

 Antigua and Barbuda First Division: 1
2014–15

References 

Football clubs in Antigua and Barbuda
1960 establishments in Antigua and Barbuda